Justis is a surname. Notable people with the surname include:

 Bill Justis (1926–1982), a rock and roll musician
 Walt Justis (1883–1941), a Major League Baseball pitcher

See also
 Justice (disambiguation)
 Justis Huni (born 1999), Australian boxer